Varitentacula yantaiensis is a species of deep sea hydrozoan of the family Halicreatidae. It is the only species in the monotypic genus Varitentacula.

References

Halicreatidae
Animals described in 1980
Monotypic cnidarian genera
Hydrozoan genera